No Clear Mind is a Greek music trio that formed in 2006 in Chania, Greece by multi-instrumentalists Vasilis Dokakis, Lefteris Volanis and Kostas Rovlias. No Clear Mind have released three studio albums, Dream is Destiny in 2012, Mets in 2013, and Makena in 2016.

History
The band played its debut shows in Greece and Italy in 2008 and are usually joined by a number of fellow musicians for their gigs. They have toured in Europe, played a number of festivals and opened for popular artists such as Ulrich Schnauss and A Whisper in the Noise. Their music received enthusiastic reviews and coverage, while The XX have previously featured them in one of their music blog post series in 2010.

Line-up
 Vasilis Ntokakis – vocals, guitars, keyboards, bass guitar
 Lefteris Volanis – guitars, vocals, keyboards
 Dimitris Pagidas - keyboards

Discography

Studio albums 
 Dream is Destiny (2012)
 Mets (2013)
 Makena (2016)

 EPs 
 Matteus Split (2009) Alpha (2010)''

References

External links 
 No Clear Mind on Facebook
 No Clear Mind on Spotify
 No Clear Mind on Bandcamp

Greek musical duos